DPR Construction is a commercial general contractor and construction management firm based in Redwood City, California. The privately-held, employee-owned company has 30 offices throughout the United States and specializes in technically complex and sustainable projects for the advanced technology/mission-critical, life sciences, healthcare, higher education and commercial office markets. International offices located in Europe and Asia.

History
In July 1990, DPR Construction was co-founded in Redwood City, California, by Doug Woods, Peter Nosler and Ron Davidowski (the D, the P and the R) with $750,000 of pooled resources. By the end of its first year, DPR had 10 employees.
Among the company's earliest projects were a six-month, $4.5 million tenant-improvement project for Argo Systems in Sunnyvale, California, which was followed by a $43 million wafer fabrication project for Rockwell International in Los Angeles, California.

In 1992, DPR was awarded its first ground-up project, The Terraces skilled nursing facility. In 1994, DPR Construction was awarded a $43 million semiconductor fabrication plant in Los Angeles, California, for Rockwell International, which launched DPR into a new level of building technical facilities. Many projects followed as DPR began to establish itself as a strong company with expertise in Building Information Modeling (BIM), sustainable construction, safety  and self-perform work, among other specialties.

In 1999, a year before the U.S. Green Building Council (USGBC) launched its Leadership in Energy and Environmental Design (LEED) certification program, DPR was awarded its first green project: a 110,000-sq.-ft. campus for Aspect Communications, a global provider of unified communications and collaboration services and software. Designed by William McDonough + Partners  and Form4 Architects and completed in 2001, the headquarters was then touted as the greenest structure in San Jose, California.

In 2003, DPR's Sacramento regional office became the first privately owned LEED-certified building in California's Central Valley.

In 2010, DPR's San Diego regional office became the first commercial building to achieve both LEED-NC Platinum and net-zero energy status in San Diego.

In April 2013, DPR acquired Atlanta-based Hardin Construction Company LLC. The following month, DPR's LEED-NC Platinum Phoenix regional office became the largest building in the world to achieve net-zero energy building certification from the International Living Future Institute's Living Building Challenge. Later that year in October, the David and Lucile Packard Foundation Corporate Headquarters built by DPR achieved Net-Zero Energy Building certification from the International Living Future Institute's Living Building Challenge.

In 2014, DPR's San Francisco regional office became the city's first net-zero-energy-designed office building.

Organization 

There are approximately 9,000 professional staff and craftworkers in the company.

The company serves customers nationally and internationally through regional offices around the country. DPR has 30 office locations throughout the U.S., international offices in Seoul, South Korea, Singapore, and several in Europe, and is headquartered in Redwood City, California.

Select award-winning projects 
 Arizona State University, McCord Hall at W. P. Carey School of Business (Tempe, Arizona)
 Autodesk, One Market Customer Briefing Center and Office (San Francisco, California)
 The Biodesign Institute at Arizona State University, Building A and B (Tempe, Arizona)
 Clif Bar, Headquarters (Emeryville, California)
 DPR Construction, Net-Zero Energy Phoenix Regional Office (Phoenix, Arizona)
 DPR Construction, Net-Zero Energy San Francisco Regional Office (San Francisco, California)
 David and Lucile Packard Foundation, Corporate Headquarters (Los Altos, California)
 eBay, Salt Lake City Data Center (Salt Lake City, Utah)
 Facebook, Forest City Data Center (Forest City, North Carolina)
 Facebook, Prineville Data Center (Prineville, Oregon)
 Genentech, Oceanside Production Operations (Oceanside, California)
 Genentech, Cell Culture Plant 2 (CCP-2) (Vacaville, California)
 Library of Congress, National Audio-Visual Conservation Center (Culpeper, Virginia)
 Palo Alto Medical Foundation, an affiliate of Sutter Health, Campus: (Mountain View, California)
 Palomar Medical Center, (Escondido, California)
 Sutter Health, Eden Medical Center (Castro Valley, California)
 Tampa International Airport, Baggage Claim Renovation and Expansion; Airport Cargo Service Road, Tunnel and Related Work; Main Terminal Modernization (Tampa, Florida)
 UCSF Medical Center at Mission Bay (San Francisco, California)
 UCSF Medical Center at Parnassus, Ray and Dagmar Dolby Regeneration Medicine Building (San Francisco, California)

References

External links 
 
 The DPR Foundation

Construction and civil engineering companies established in 1990
Companies based in Redwood City, California
Construction and civil engineering companies of the United States
1990 establishments in California